Ermelinda Meksi is an Albanian politician, who held different positions in the Cabinet of Albania during the years 1997 to 2005. She is the first woman to be appointed as Deputy Prime Minister, the highest office held by a woman at the time in Albania.

Biography 
Meksi graduated from the University of Tirana in 1979. Later she obtained her PhD in economics there. She worked for many years as a professor at the Faculty of Economics.

In 1992 she was elected a Member of the Parliament of the Republic of Albania and held this position until November 2011. 
During the Socialist government she served as Minister of State for Foreign Assistance and Development in 1997 - 1998, than as Minister of Economy until 2002.
In June 2003 she was appointed as Deputy Prime Minister in the new government formed by Fatos Nano and served at this position until December 2003. After that she was appointed as Minister of European Integration, a recently created Ministry, to help the process of European Integration.

Meksi served as Member of the Parliament until 2011, when the mandate was terminated after being elected a member of the Bank of Albania’s Supervisory Council by the Parliament.

References 

1957 births
Living people
People from Tirana
University of Tirana alumni
Deputy Prime Ministers of Albania
Economy ministers of Albania
Integration ministers of Albania
21st-century Albanian politicians
21st-century Albanian women politicians
Socialist Party of Albania politicians
20th-century Albanian politicians
Government ministers of Albania
Women government ministers of Albania
20th-century Albanian women politicians